The 500 metres distance for women in the 2011–12 ISU Speed Skating World Cup was contested over 12 races on six occasions, out of a total of seven World Cup occasions for the season, with the first occasion taking place in Chelyabinsk, Russia, on 18–20 November 2011, and the final occasion taking place in Berlin, Germany, on 9–11 March 2012.

Yu Jing of China won the cup, while Lee Sang-hwa of South Korea came second, and the defending champion, Jenny Wolf of Germany, came third.

Top three

Race medallists

Standings 
Standings as of 11 March 2012 (end of the season).

References 

Women 0500
ISU